Doctor Mike is a Russian-born American Internet celebrity and family medicine physician.

Doctor Mike may also refer to:

 Michael Arnheim, English nonfiction author
 John M. Ford, American science fiction/fantasy author
 Michaela Quinn, the protagonist of the American television series Dr. Quinn, Medicine Woman